Vara Concert Hall (Vara konserthus) is a concert hall at Vara in  Västra Götaland County, Sweden. The concert hall was designed by architect Blake J McConahy and was inaugurated in September 2003. It has two halls; the main one has 517 seats and the smaller one has 67 seats.

See also
 List of concert halls

References

External links
Official homepage

Concert halls in Sweden
Buildings and structures in Västra Götaland County